XEUNO-AM is a radio station on 1120 AM in Guadalajara, Jalisco, Mexico. It is owned by Grupo Radio Centro and operated by Grupo Acustik, broadcasting as Arre en Acustik.

History
XEVMC-AM received its concession on February 11, 1963. It was owned by and named for Víctor Manuel Chávez y Chávez. In 1967, Chávez y Chávez sold to Radio Difusora de Jalisco, S.A., and the station was rechristened XEUNO-AM.

In 1984, Difusora Central de México bought XEUNO. PRAM, initially a concessionaire for Radiorama, acquired the station in 1992. Around that time, the station aired the English classics format "Universal", then heard in Mexico City on XEQR-FM.

In 2015, Organización PRAM was replaced by Radio Emisora XHSP-FM as the concessionaire as part of a restructuring of the stations then owned by Grupo Radio México. GRM merged with corporate cousin Grupo Radio Centro in 2016.

On September 2, 2019, Radio 1 changed to Acustik Radio with a regional Mexican format. That same day, Acustik began programming two other former Radio Centro AM stations, XEJP-AM in Mexico City and XEMN-AM in Monterrey.

References

1963 establishments in Mexico
Grupo Radio Centro
Radio stations established in 1963
Radio stations in Guadalajara
Regional Mexican radio stations
Spanish-language radio stations